Mikhail Morozov may refer to:
 Mikhail Mikhailovich Morozov (1897-1952), Russian Shakespeare scholar
 Mikhail Morozov (art collector) (1870-1903), Russian businessman, art collector and patron of art